Johann Nepomuk Prix (b. 1826 in Vienna, d. 1894) was a mayor of Vienna.

Footnotes

References
H. Wohlrab: Prix Johann Nepomuk. In: Österreichisches Biographisches Lexikon 1815–1950 (ÖBL). Band 8, Verlag der Österreichischen Akademie der Wissenschaften, Wien 1983.

Mayors of Vienna
1826 births
1894 deaths